Ciklamen is a novel by Slovenian author Janko Kersnik. It was first published in 1883 in Ljubljanski zvon.

Content 
The story is happening in 1872, but chapter V. tracks back to 1872. The author describes the life of the people of Borje, a small settlement in Carniola. The protagonist is country jurist Dr Hrast and he is in love with German governess Elza. She, however, later married German nobleman Meden. Dr Hrast then turns his interests to his adolescent love Katlinka, now wife of a rich sick landowner. After the death of the landowner, she married Dr Hrast.

The writer is not only focusing to love stories but also on descriptions of scenery and cultural events, that took place in reading society. Janko is also emphasizing Slovene national consciousness and values characters based on this.

See also
List of Slovenian novels

Slovenian novels
1883 novels